The 1836 United States Senate election in Pennsylvania was held on December 14, 1836. Future President of the United States James Buchanan was re-elected by the Pennsylvania General Assembly to the United States Senate.

Background
After Sen. William Wilkins resigned from office to become U.S. Minister to Russia, James Buchanan was elected by the General Assembly, consisting of the House of Representatives and the Senate, in 1834 to serve the remainder of the unexpired term, which was to expire on March 4, 1837.

Results
The Pennsylvania General Assembly convened on December 14, 1836, to elect a Senator to serve the term beginning on March 4, 1837. The results of the vote of both houses combined are as follows:

|-
|-bgcolor="#EEEEEE"
| colspan="3" align="right" | Totals
| align="right" | 133
| align="right" | 100.00%
|}

References

External links
Pennsylvania Election Statistics: 1682-2006 from the Wilkes University Election Statistics Project

1836
Pennsylvania
United States Senate
December 1836 events